Nicholas David Gordon Knight OBE (born 24 November 1958) is a British fashion photographer and founder and director of SHOWstudio.com. He is an honorary professor at University of the Arts London and was awarded an honorary Ph.D. by the same university. He has produced books of his work including retrospectives Nicknight (1994) and Nick Knight (2009). In 2016, Knight's 1992 campaign photograph for fashion brand Jil Sander was sold by Phillips auction house at the record-breaking price of HKD 2,360,000.

Life and career
Knight was born in Hammersmith, London. He studied photography at Bournemouth and Poole College of Art and Design and published his first book of photographs 'Skinhead' in 1982 when he was still a student at the school. He was then commissioned by i-D editor Terry Jones to create a series of portraits for magazine's fifth-anniversary issue. His work caught the attention of art director Marc Ascoli, who commissioned Knight to shoot the 1986 catalog of Japanese designer Yohji Yamamoto in collaboration with Peter Saville.

In 1992 Knight took a year long break from fashion photography to work on an exhibition at Natural History Museum, London with the British architect David Chipperfield. The exhibition was called Plant Power and was on the theme of the relationship between humans and plants. The exhibition lasted for fifteen years.

In November 2000, Knight launched SHOWstudio.com.

He directed his first music video in 2001, for the song "Pagan Poetry" by Björk. In 2003, he created a film for Massive Attack's album 100th Window. In 2011 and 2013, he directed the videos for Lady Gaga's single "Born This Way" and Kanye West's "Bound 2" and "Black Skinhead." In 2016, he photographed American rapper/singer Travis Scott for his sophomore album Birds in the Trap Sing McKnight.

In 2016, he was commissioned to shoot official portraits of Queen Elizabeth and Prince Charles for the Queen's 90th birthday.

Also in 2016, Knight's hand-coated pigment photographic work, Tatjana Patitz for Jil Sander, 1992 sold for an artist-record $304,204 at Phillips Hong Kong. The work, originally photographed in 1992 and reprinted in 2016, featured supermodel Tatjana Patitz in a Jil Sander advertising campaign photographed by Knight. The celebrated photograph from Knight's commercial career in the fashion industry represents the collectability of his painterly works to buyers in the world of fine art.

In 2019, he collaborated with Kanye West again, directing his short film Jesus Is King. Filmed in the summer of 2019, the film brings West's Sunday Service to life in the Roden Crater, artist James Turrell's installation in the Painted Desert. The film accompanied the release of Jesus Is King, West's ninth studio album, and was released in IMAX theaters on October 25, 2019.

In 2021, he reunited with Gaga for a collaboration with Champagne brand Dom Perignon on the campaign "The Queendom", in order to realize a series of photos as well as an advertisement, which was released on April 6.

Following the announcement of Lady Gaga’s 2022 Summer Stadium World Tour, The Chromatica Ball, Knight was charged to shoot a series of interludes several weeks before it started, matching the twisted dark fantasy visuals Gaga had in mind for her shows.

Selected exhibitions

A few of Nick Knight's exhibitions are listed below:

2016
Nick Knight, Christophe Guye Galerie, Zürich, Switzerland
 Nick Knight: Image, Daelim Museum, Seoul, South Korea
 History of Photography: The Body, Victoria and Albert Museum, London
 #techstyle, Museum of Fine Arts, Boston, United States of America
 Vogue 100, National Portrait Gallery, London
2015   
Vogue Like a Painting, Museo Thyssen-Bornemisza, Madrid, Spain
Killer Heels, Victoria and Albert Museum, London
Alexander McQueen: Savage Beauty, Victoria and Albert Museum, London
2014
 Killer Heels, Brooklyn Museum, Brooklyn New York, United States
2012
 Icons of Tomorrow – Contemporary Fashion Photography, Christophe Guye Galerie, Zurich, Switzerland 
2011
 Vanity, Kunsthalle Vienna, Austria
2009
 Fashion Revolution, Somerset House, London
2006
 Archeology of Elegance, Deichtorhallen Museum, Hamburg, Germany
 Talking to Myself, Yohji Yamamoto, La Masion Européenne de la Photographie, Paris
2001
 Century City, Tate Modern, London
2000    
 CUT, (Exhibition By The Hairdresser Barnabee) Musee De La Mode, Paris
 La Beaute, Exhibition For EN2000, Avignon, France
 Facing The Future, Touring Exhibition to Celebrate 20 Years of The Face Magazine
 Das Fernglas, German Hygiene Museum, Dresden, Germany
 Nadja, Exhibition Celebrating Nadja Auermann, Germany
 Imperfect Beauty, Victoria and Albert Museum, London
 Nurture and Desire, Hayward Gallery, London
1998    
 Look at me – Fashion Photography 1965 to Present, British Council Traveling Exhibition
 Powerhause:uk, Department of Trade and Industry
 The Oriental Curiosity – 21st Century Chinoiserie, Traveling exhibition, (London, Paris, Hong Kong)
 Shoreditch Biennale, London
 The first 25 (retrospective exhibition of images from Visionaire magazine), Colette, Paris
 Addressing the Century: 100 Years of Art and Fashion, Hayward Gallery, London
 No Sex Please we’re British, Dazed & Confused, and Shiseido Co Ltd, Japan
 Yves Saint Laurent – 40 Years of Creation, New York, and Tokyo
 Silver & Syrup, Victoria and Albert Museum, London
1997    
 Contemporary Fashion Photography, Victoria and Albert Museum, London
 JAM, Barbican Gallery, London
 Little Boxes, (to accompany the launch of Michael Mack's book, „Surface - Contemporary. Photographic Practice“); Traveling exhibition curated by Michael Mack
1996
 Art/Fashion (with Alexander McQueen), Biennale di Firenze, Italy
1994  
 A Positive View, Saatchi Gallery, London
1993    
 Vanities Exhibition, Paris
 Plant Power, (permanent exhibit), Natural History Museum, London
1992  
 Festival De La Photo De Mode Exhibition, Monaco
1991    
 Festival De La Photo De Mode Exhibition, Barcelona, Spain
1989    
 Out of Fashion, The Photographers' Gallery, London
 Ils Annoncent La Colour, Rencontres d'Arles, Holly     
1986  
 20 For Today, National Portrait Gallery, London
 14-21 Youth Culture Exhibition, Victoria and Albert Museum, London
1982   
 Group Exhibition 1982, The Photographers' Gallery, London

Publications
Skinhead. London; New York: Omnibus, 1982. .
Nicknight. Munich: Schirmer/Mosel, 1994. . Produced and directed by Marc Ascoli, Nick Knight, and Peter Saville. Written by Satoko Nakahara.
Flora. Text by Sandra Knapp, art direction by Peter Saville, design by Paul Barnes. Initiated in 1993 for his installation of Plant Power at the Natural History Museum, London.
Munich: Schirmer/Mosel, 1997. . Hardback.
'Harry N. Abrams, Inc., 2003. . Paperback.
Nick Knight. With an introduction by Charlotte Cotton.
New York: Collins Design, 2009. .
Harper Design, 2015. .
Isabella Blow: Fashion Galore!. New York: Rizzoli, 2013. .

Awards
 2015 - Isabella Blow Award for Fashion Creator at British Fashion Awards.

See also 
 Big 4 (sculpture)

References

External links

Nick Knight: Techno King, The New York Times

1958 births
Living people
British music video directors
Documentary photographers
Fashion photographers
People from Hammersmith
Officers of the Order of the British Empire
Alumni of Arts University Bournemouth
20th-century British photographers
21st-century British photographers
Photographers from London